"The Night Shift" is the second episode of the American murder mystery comedy-drama television series Poker Face. The episode was written by consulting producer Alice Ju and directed by series creator Rian Johnson. It was released on Peacock on January 26, 2023, alongside "Dead Man's Hand", "The Stall" and "Rest in Metal".

The series follows Charlie Cale, a woman with the ability to detect if people are lying. After using her ability to win poker tournaments, she is caught by a powerful casino owner in Laughlin. Rather than banning her from his casino, he gives her a job as a waitress. After finding that her friend has been found dead, Charlie uncovered a plot where the owner's son ordered her murder to protect a powerful client. She is now on the run after exposing the casino, with head of security Cliff going after her. The episode follows Charlie fleeing to New Mexico to repair her car, while also befriending a woman from the area. When the woman is arrested for suspected murder, Charlie sets out to prove her innocence.

The episode received positive reviews from critics, who praised Johnson's directing, performances, character development and pacing.

Plot
In New Mexico, Damian (Brandon Micheal Hall) is a Marine Corps veteran who now works at a Subway. He often visits Sara (Megan Suri), a convenience store clerk whom he has a crush on, to buy a lottery ticket every day. As part of their routine, Sara lends Damian a state quarter from her collection to scratch the ticket. A young mechanic named Jed (Colton Ryan) is also interested in Sara, although he makes her uncomfortable. At night, Damian visits Jed to urge him to dial back his behavior, which seems to disturb Jed. Damian suddenly realizes that he finally won $25,000 in the lottery, which prompts Jed to throw him off his shop's roof. He then finishes killing Damian with a blow to the head, although Damian slashes Jed in the calf before dying. After stealing the lottery ticket, Jed disposes of the body by hiding it in a parked semi nearby. He returns to his shop, where he spies a trucker, Marge (Hong Chau), discover the body in her truck and stash it by the dumpster outside the shop.  He calls the police to report Marge in order to deflect suspicion.

One day prior, while driving, Charlie (Natasha Lyonne) is forced to leave her Plymouth Barracuda at an auto shop. The mechanic, Abe (John Ratzenberger), informs her that he can repair it, but it will cost $400, which Charlie does not currently have. He allows her to keep the Plymouth at the shop under the care of his nephew, Jed. After buying a sandwich from Damian, she stops at a restroom, where she meets Marge. Marge treats her gunshot wound with superglue and advises her on how to go off the grid, telling her she must forgo her past life. With no money and nowhere to stay, Charlie is forced to sleep outdoors on a picnic table.

The next day, Charlie returns to the shop and discovers the crime scene, which culminated with Marge's arrest. Jed returns to the convenience store where Sara works and buys a lottery ticket, pretending to have won the lottery with Damian's ticket. Since Marge told her that she was once tracked to a location within four hours of using an ATM there, Charlie retrieves $460 from the ATM and starts a four-hour timer on her watch, by which time she assumes Cliff wil have tracked her. She has her car fixed and prepares to leave. However, she decides to stay after hearing that Marge supposedly "bludgeoned" Damian despite carrying a gun. She reviews footage of the convenience store's cameras and also questions Sara. Charlie believes Sara when she says Damian never won the lottery, but suspects Jed of lying when he says the same.

At Subway, Charlie finds a Shiner Bock beer bottle cap in Damian's uniform. She reviews the shop's security footage, noting that there is a time gap in the footage, during which the camera angle changed and some nearby objects were moved. She then climbs to the rooftop, where she finds multiple caps from bottles of Shiner Bock matching the one found in Damian's uniform, as well as the Hawaii quarter Sara lent him. Jed shows up, after having his advances rejected by Sara. Charlie confronts him over Damian's visit to the rooftop, and Jed claims that Damian visited him to tell him to stay away from Sara. Checking the scratch-off, she and Sara briefly retrieve "Jed's" ticket. Charlie notes that the serial number of the winning ticket is several numbers behind that of a discarded ticket bought immediately before Jed claimed to have bought the winner, revealing that the winning ticket was actually purchased some time before.

Charlie confronts Jed, accusing him of murdering Damian. Jed tells her to go to the police, as they will probably dismiss the claim without any vital evidence. He is also aware of her identity and threatens to inform the police as she is wanted for the events in Laughlin. Charlie reluctantly leaves, as her timer beeps. However, when she hears about a hidden camera show on the radio, she visits a diner to ask about a trucker with a dashcam that filmed the events. She manages to identify the trucker and instructs the patrons to contact him and report it to the police, just as Cliff (Benjamin Bratt) arrives at the convenience store. When he asks Sara about Charlie, Sara misleads him into thinking that Charlie was heading to Los Angeles after noticing that Cliff is carrying a gun. Abe briefly confronts Jed, pointing out that the brakes on Charlie's car were sabotaged but that he fixed them. Abe implies that he knows what Jed has done. As night falls, Jed burns the lottery ticket on his rooftop as police cruisers arrive at the shop.

Production

Development
The series was announced in March 2021, with Rian Johnson serving as creator, writer, director and executive producer. Johnson stated that the series would delve into "the type of fun, character driven, case-of-the-week mystery goodness I grew up watching." The episode was directed by Johnson, while consulting producer Alice Ju wrote it. This was Johnson's second directing credit and Ju's first writing credit.

Casting
The announcement of the series included that Natasha Lyonne would serve as the main lead actress. She was approached by Johnson about working on a procedural project together, with Lyonne as the lead character. As Johnson explained, the role was "completely cut to measure for her." Benjamin Bratt also joined the series in the recurring role of Cliff, whose character chases Charlie after she ran away from the casino in the previous episode.

Due to the series' procedural aspects, the episodes feature several guest stars. Johnson was inspired by the amount of actors who guest starred on Columbo, wanting to deem each guest star as the star of the episode, which allowed them to attract many actors. The episode featured appearances by Hong Chau, Megan Suri, Colton Ryan, and Brandon Micheal Hall, who were announced to guest star in September 2022. John Ratzenberger also guest stars in the episode as Abe, with Johnson noting that the casting was part of "people coming onscreen that are gonna give you joy". He also added, "We're going for casting that's gonna give you the tingles."

Filming
The episode was filmed in the outskirts of Albuquerque, New Mexico. For the episode, production designer Judy Rhee and her crew built the Subway where Damian works, as well as Abe's garage. Despite the use of Subway in the episode, the series was not paid for the product placement. Due to the murder nature of the episode, the series asked Subway for permission to use their logo on the series. According to executive producer Nora Zuckerman, many pedestrians stopped by the built-in Subway, believing to be a real Subway.

Critical reception
"The Night Shift" received positive reviews from critics. Saloni Gajjar of The A.V. Club gave the episode a "B+" grade and wrote, "She didn't expect to use her powers for this work, but here we are anyway. Poker Face begins with a luxurious pace as Charlie adapts to her surroundings, but it's a strong start; our patience is well-rewarded in these hourlong episodes."

Alan Sepinwall of Rolling Stone praised the episode, although he felt the episode took too long to place Charlie into the story, "the second episode, involving a trio of people working the night shift at shops next to a truck stop, really only takes off once that familiar mop of strawberry blonde hair comes into view. And even when she turns up, the flashback segments may occasionally leave you impatient to get to the part where Charlie begins poking holes in the killer's story." Amanda Whiting of Vulture gave the episode a 3 star rating out of 5 and wrote, "This risk-taking behavior may be the series' most complicated investigation so far. Charlie isn't Columbo, a homicide cop with open cases to clear. So why does she feel compelled to use her very particular set of skills for the greater good? In episode two, the answer is specific. Marge, a trucker who briefly helps Charlie on the road, ends up falsely accused of murder. Charlie helps, I guess, because she knows Marge to be a good person. Like Sir Galahad himself, she's pure and well intentioned — almost chivalrous, really, if you can accept that sometimes a knight rides a white horse and sometimes a knight is bleeding from the abdomen in a truck-stop bathroom."

References

External links
 

Poker Face (TV series) episodes
2023 American television episodes
Television episodes directed by Rian Johnson
Television episodes set in New Mexico